The C.H. Baker Double House, also known as the Indiana Apartments, The Manor, and The Manor House, is an historic building located in Des Moines, Iowa, United States.  Built from 1901 to 1902, it is a two-story structure that features balloon frame construction with brick veneer.  It was designed in the Colonial Revival style by the Des Moines architectural firm of Smith & Gutterson.  Its significance is attributed to its location on the Sixth Avenue streetcar route "to capitalize on the
appeal of public transportation."  It was one of the first multiple-family rental properties along the avenue, and it was built for upper-middle class occupancy.  It was part of the movement toward denser  residential use in this area of the city.  The house was listed on the National Register of Historic Places in 1996.

References

Houses completed in 1902
Colonial Revival architecture in Iowa
Houses in Des Moines, Iowa
National Register of Historic Places in Des Moines, Iowa
Houses on the National Register of Historic Places in Iowa